The Community of Saint Martin is a public association of clerics according to pontifical law, gathering Roman Catholic priests and deacons. It was founded in 1976 by Father Jean-François Guérin, a priest from the Archdiocese of Tours (France), under the protection of Cardinal Giuseppe Siri, Archbishop of Genoa (Italy).  In 2018, the Community included 115 priests and more than 100 seminarians. Priests of the Community work in parishes, schools, nursing homes, chaplaincies, or sanctuaries in 22 French dioceses, in the Archdiocese of Cologne (Germany), and in Cuba and Italy. Some members of the Community are also at the service of the Holy See, and entrusted with various missions in Rome or in apostolic nunciatures. The two main characteristics of the Community are the mobility of its members and the fact that they live their ministry together. The priests and deacons of the Community are sent in small groups of at least three to live and pray together in a spiritual and practical brotherhood.

History

Between 1965 and 1976, Guérin was active in Paris. He was chaplain of the Basilica of Sacré Cœur in Montmartre, and he had an important apostolate with the youth as many had chosen him as their spiritual director. While many of these youths chose to enter a religious order, often in the Benedictine and Carmelite traditions, some felt that their call was to become secular priests in the same way that Guérin was. This meant living their priesthood in community with others and pursuing his liturgical spirit rooted in the Latin and Gregorian tradition of the Roman rite, and in the liturgical movement as it found its clear expression in the Second Vatican Council.

As Cardinal Siri sought to help the French Church to promote the renewal of priestly training, he received Fr. Guérin and his first seminarians in his diocese in 1976. Thus the Community of Saint Martin was founded in Italy to give priests to the Catholic Church in France. Guérin and his students established themselves in the Capuchin convent of Genoa-Voltri. The seminarians followed the academic part of their training in the Genoa seminary, while Guérin took charge of their human and spiritual formation.

In 1983 the Community got its first pastoral mission in the Diocese of Fréjus-Toulon in south-eastern France. In the following years, other French bishops entrusted parishes to the Community. In 1993 there was an opportunity for the Mother House to move from Italy and to establish the Community's House of Training in France in the village of Candé-sur-Beuvron, near Blois in the Loire Valley (about 200 km / 125 miles south of Paris). After twenty years there, the Community moved to Évron in north-western France to accommodate the sharp increase in vocations.

In September 2014, the Community moved its Mother House and House of Training to the former Évron Abbey in the department of Mayenne. There the intellectual formation of the seminarians is given by their School of Theology, affiliated since 2007 with the Pontifical Lateran University. The human and spiritual formation is given by a team of six full-time priests while the pastoral formation takes place during the vacations and during the intermediate year between the cycle of philosophy and theology when each seminarian spends one year living in a parish of the Community. Their training consists of eight years in all to become a priest, but some choose to become unmarried permanent deacons.

Canonical status
The first canonical recognition of the Community was granted by Cardinal Siri in 1979. His successor as archbishop of Genoa, Cardinal Giovanni Canestri, recognized the Community as a public clerical association of diocesan right. In 2000 it got the status of a public clerical association of pontifical right and in 2008 the Congregation for the Clergy gave the power to the Moderator-General of the Community to incardinate its members, priests and deacons.

Spirituality
“Martinian” spirituality has three sources :

 The Benedictine tradition of the Solesmes Congregation. Father Guérin was an oblate of Fontgombault Abbey and a disciple of Prosper Guéranger's spirituality of the liturgical year. He was also inherited from the developments of the twentieth century by the liturgical movement.
 The French school of spirituality with figures such as Pierre de Bérulle and Vincent de Paul as well as the Society of the Priests of Saint Sulpice.
 The communal life as lived out by the Canons Regular under the Rule of Saint Augustine.

Drawing from these three traditions, Lectio Divina is a daily practice for the Community as well as the celebration of the Liturgy of the Hours sung in Latin according to the Ordinary form of the Roman Rite.

See also
 Martin of Tours

References

External links
 

Catholic orders and societies
Christian organizations established in 1976